Mohammad Ali Kassas (born 1 July 1976) is a Lebanese former professional footballer who played as a striker. He is the technical director of  club Nejmeh. 

Kassas was the Lebanese Premier League top goalscorer for Nejmeh twice in a row, scoring 22 goals in 2003–04 and 21 goals in 2004–05. He also represented the Lebanon national team, scoring three goals in 23 appearances.

Club career
Kassas started his senior career in 1988, aged 12, at Mabarra in the Lebanese Fourth Division. He helped the side reach the Lebanese Second Division, before moving on a trial to Ansar during the summer of 1997. In 1997 Kassas moved to Safa and played for one season. During the 1999–2000 season, Kassas played for Shabab Sahel, before moving to Sagesse for two seasons; he scored 18 league goals in 45 games with the side. In 2002, Kassas moved to Olympic Beirut for $500,000 in the largest deal in Lebanese history, with whom he won the domestic double, then to Nejmeh in 2003. At Nejmeh, Kassas was crowned top goalscorer of the Lebanese Premier League twice in a row, scoring 22 goals in 2003–04 and 21 goals in 2004–05. He also won the Lebanese Premier League in both seasons.

In 2005, Kassas moved to Saudi Arabian side Al-Qadsiah for one season, where he scored six league goals. He returned to Lebanon the following season, signing for Sagesse in 2006. He then moved to Ahed, before moving to Syria in 2008 as he signed for Nawair. After half a season in Syria, Kassas returned once again to Lebanon, signing first for Shabab Sahel in 2009, for whom he scored 6 league goals, then for Sagesse in 2009. 

In 2010, Kassas joined Safa, helping them reach the final of the 2010 AFC Cup. In 2011, he left Lebanon to sign for Jordanian side Al-Ramtha; he scored 16 league goals in 33 games in two seasons at the club. Kassas was also sent on loan to Mabarra in 2012. helping them gain promotion to the Lebanese Premier League. Kassas returned to Lebanon in 2013, signing for Nabi Chit and also helping them gain promotion to the Lebanese Premier League. In 2014 Kassas returned to Al-Ramtha, before making his final return to Lebanon in 2014, signing for Sagesse. In 2016, Kassas joined Safa and scored three goals in 11 matches during the 2016–17 season, where he retired.

In March 2021, Kassas returned from retirement, resigning for Sagesse in the Lebanese Second Division ahead of the second leg.

International career 
In 2002, Kassas played for the Lebanon Olympic team at the 2002 Asian Games, scoring a hat-trick in an 11–0 win against Afghanistan.

Managerial career 
In April 2022, Kassas was appointed technical director of Nejmeh.

Honours 
Olympic Beirut
 Lebanese Premier League: 2002–03
 Lebanese FA Cup: 2002–03

Nejmeh
 Lebanese Premier League: 2003–04, 2004–05

Ahed
 Lebanese Premier League: 2007–08

Individual
 Lebanese Premier League top scorer: 2003–04, 2004–05
 Lebanese Premier League Team of the Season: 2001–02, 2003–04, 2004–05, 2008–09

References

External links
 
 
 

1976 births
Living people
People from Baalbek District
Lebanese footballers
Association football forwards
Al Mabarra Club players
Al Ansar FC players
Safa SC players
Shabab Al Sahel FC players
Sagesse SC footballers
Olympic Beirut players
Nejmeh SC players
Al-Qadsiah FC players
Al Ahed FC players
Nawair SC players
Al-Ramtha SC players
Al Nabi Chit SC players
Lebanese Premier League players
Saudi Professional League players
Syrian Premier League players
Jordanian Pro League players
Lebanese Second Division players
Lebanon youth international footballers
Lebanon international footballers
Asian Games competitors for Lebanon
Footballers at the 2002 Asian Games
Lebanese Premier League top scorers
Lebanese expatriate footballers
Lebanese expatriate sportspeople in Saudi Arabia
Lebanese expatriate sportspeople in Syria
Lebanese expatriate sportspeople in Jordan
Expatriate footballers in Saudi Arabia
Expatriate footballers in Syria
Expatriate footballers in Jordan